Ireland national cerebral palsy football team is the national cerebral football team for Ireland that represents the team in international competitions.  They have participated in several Paralympic Games and World Championships.  They have won two bronze medals and a silver at the Paralympics.  Their best finish at the World Championships was first at the 1982 edition in Denmark.

Background 

Paralympics Ireland manages the national team. In 2011, members of the Irish national team participated in a study that looking at endurance and running performance as part of a researcher's efforts to understand the fairness of cerebral palsy football classification. In October 2014, an IFCPF coaching workshop was held in Wales to try to further develop the sport, with participants from Wales, England and the Republic of Ireland. While Ireland was active in participating on the Paralympic and World Championship level by 2016, the country did not have a national championships to support national team player development.

In 2016, after getting an endorsement by the World AntiDoping Agency (WADA), the IFCPF Anti-Doping Code was formally amended to allow for out of competition testing.  This was done through a WADA approved Whereabouts Programme managed through ADAMS. Drawing from players in a  Registered Testing Pool, players from this country were included ahead of the 2016 Summer Paralympics in Rio.

Ranking 

Ireland was ranked fifth in the world by the IFCPF in 2016. In September 2012, August 2013 and November 2014, the team was ranked number seven in the world. In July 2011, the team was ranked sixth in the world.

Players 
There have been a number of players for the Ireland squad.

Results 

Ireland has participated in a number of international tournaments.

IFCPF World Championships 
The Republic of Ireland has participated in the IFCPF World Championships. At the 2011 CP-ISRA World Championship in Drenthe, Ireland beat Canada 6 - 0.

Paralympic Games 

Ireland has participated in 7-a-side football at the Paralympic Games.  Their best performance was at the 1992 and 1984 Games when they won silver medals.  They also won a bronze at the 1988 Games.  After qualifying for the gold medal game in the sport's debut at the 1984 Summer Games, they lost their match to Belgium to finish with a silver medal.

Paralympic Results

References 

C
Ireland at the Paralympics
National cerebral palsy football teams
Football 7-a-side teams at the 2016 Summer Paralympics
Football 7-a-side teams at the 2008 Summer Paralympics
Football 7-a-side teams at the 2004 Summer Paralympics
Football 7-a-side teams at the 1996 Summer Paralympics
Football 7-a-side teams at the 1992 Summer Paralympics
Football 7-a-side teams at the 1988 Summer Paralympics
Football 7-a-side teams at the 1984 Summer Paralympics